Selsdon Wood is a woodland area located in the London Borough of Croydon. The park is owned by the National Trust but managed by the London Borough of Croydon. It is a Local Nature Reserve.
The wood has a Friends group - the Friends of Selsdon Wood (FSW) - who have their own website.

Sir Julian Huxley (a zoological scientist) was one of the main backers of the Selsdon Wood Nature Reserve.

Access
Main entrance to the park is off Old Farleigh Road, served by bus stop Forestdale, Selsdon Nature Reserve on Surrey routes 353 and 409; the London Buses route 433 serves nearby Sandpiper Road, while the London Buses route 353 serves Court Wood Lane at the back of the wood. The London Loop path (Section 4 West Wickham Common to Hamsey Green) runs through the park. The park is fully accessible at all times.

Facilities 
Selsdon Wood facilities include:
Car park (One bay available for the disabled) at Old Farleigh Road entrance
Pond
Public footpaths — including Section 4 of the London LOOP (London Outer Orbital Path); West Wickham Common to Hamsey Green section.
 Includes part of the Vanguard Way
Seats
Toilets at Old Farleigh Road entrance (Closed)
Woodlands and open meadows

See also
List of Parks and Open Spaces in Croydon
Addington Hills
Addington Interchange
Ashburton Park
Brickfields Meadow
Woodside Green

References

External links

London Borough of Croydon: Parks and open spaces
Croydon Online — parks + open spaces
Transport for London: walkfinder
Geograph photo: Selsdon Wood.

Parks and open spaces in the London Borough of Croydon
Local nature reserves in Greater London
Nature reserves in the London Borough of Croydon